ICAC Investigators 2014 is the 2014 edition of the ICAC Investigator series, produced by Independent Commission Against Corruption (Hong Kong) (ICAC) and broadcast on TVB. Each criminal case is based on actual cases investigated by the ICAC.

Cast and Synopsis

Case #1: Better Tomorrow
Starring:
Liu Kai-chi as ICAC Martin
Jo Koo as Betty Lai
Venus Wong as ICAC Kwok Siu Lam
Hugo Wong as Patrick
Lily Li as Betty Lai's mother
Kwok Siu Lam (Venus Wong) is a new ICAC investigator, she is very ambitious and hopes to be assigned to major cases right away. However her first assignment is a case to investigate supermarket workers that takes bribes for selling baby milk powder. Siu Lam gets close to supermarket manager Betty Lai (Jo Koo) in order to uncover the true operation of this scheme, but seeing Betty as a single mother with a young daughter to take care of she is disappointed to see regular citizens resort to taking bribes in order to make ends meet. Senior investigator Martin (Liu Kai Chi) reminds Siu Lam of why ICAC was set up, in order to rid those who corrupt to better themselves. With Martin's assurance she is reminded of why she wanted to be an ICAC agent and realize all ICAC cases are treated the same. ICAC finds out that Betty withholds stocks from hitting the supermarket selves in order to sell large shipments to a mainland supplier for a cut of the profit because milk powder are resold at a higher price in mainland.
Actual case:
The case is based on the 2011 ParknShop supermarket chain baby milk powder bribery case code name "sunshine". Baby milk powder produced in Japan were rationed in Hong Kong due to the 2011 Tōhoku earthquake and tsunami, milk powder supply was limited. Supermarket workers would take bribes in order to inform customers when shipments of milk powder would arrive and also selling large quantities to Mainland suppliers for a cut of the profit sold in Mainland.

Case #2: Web of Greed
Starring:
Lawrence Cheng as Leung Tak Sing
 Tse Kwan-ho as ICAC Chapman Cheuk
Raymond Wong Ho-yin as ICAC Mak Siu Tin
Leung Tak Sing (Lawrence Cheng) is the Chief Building Services Engineer of the Housing Department in Hong Kong. He uses his position to take bribes from contractor in exchange for issuing government contracts to them. He is very cautious of his dealings and tends to meet those giving him bribes in open areas using code words to discuss their dealings. ICAC investigators Chapman Cheuk (Gardner Tse) and Mak Siu Tin (Raymond Wong) are on to him but unable to find any solid evidence against him. They seek the help of other government departments and ask for the Housing Department permission to install hidden cameras in Tak Sing's office. With video evidence of Tak Sing counting his bribe money in his office ICAC is able to make an arrest.
Actual case: The case is based on Chan Kau-tai, who is also the father of Hong Kong singer actor Eason Chan. Chan Kau-tai was convicted for accepting HK $3 million in bribes and served a 6-year sentence.

Case #3: Money Mind
Starring:
Alice Chan as Yip Mei Lan
Joyce Tang as ICAC Cheung Man Fung
Shirley Yeung as Jo Jo Yeung
Jason Chan as ICAC Raymond Wong Chi Chung
Yip Mei Lan (Alice Chan) is a well known Hong Kong businesswomen. Her personal story is legendary as she rose from poor noodle shop operator in the mainland to the top of Hong Kong high society, but her rise was not easy. She sacrifices herself by marrying a Hong Kong man she did not love in order to gain Hong Kong citizenship. Once she became a citizen she divorces her Hong Kong husband and abandons their daughter, so she can legally marry her mainland husband and have him immigrate to Hong Kong. Once Mei Lan and her mainland husband are together again they ambitiously build an empire by investing in real-estate and opening night clubs. Her ambitions get the better of her when she begins insider trading, in the end she feels like the most foolish women in world when she finds out her mainland husband whom she sacrificed so much for uses their wealth to support his many mistresses.
Actual case: The case is based on 2006 Mao Yuping credit fraud case. Mao Yuping, wife of Shanghai tycoon Zhou Zhengyi, was sentenced to 32 months in prison for conspiracy to defraud using letters of credits worth HK$49 million (US$6.32 million). Mao Yuping is also known for famously slapping Hong Kong actress Kristy Yeung in 2002 at a restaurant in public for having an affair with her husband Zhou Zhengyi.

Case #4: Goal Tricks
Starring:
Ruco Chan as ICAC Kelvin Chan Kwok Yan
K. K. Cheung as ICAC Lee Chi Chung
Sire Ma as ICAC BoBo Law Po Man
Ronald Law Kwan Moon as Kong Chi Wah
Kong Chi Wah (Ronald Law) is an aspiring and passionate soccer player who goes astray when he gets entangled with illegal soccer gamblers. To make money on the side he starts to purposely throw soccer games but matters become worse when he starts to recruit other soccer players to throw the game also. ICAC is tipped off of the illegal gamblings happening with the players. ICAC investigator Kelvin Chan Kwok Yan (Ruco Chan), Lee Chi Chung (Cheung Kwok Keung) and BoBo Law Po Man (Sire Ma) secretly investigate on the players. Some of players agree to throwing the game to make money on the side while some who remain dedicated to their game continue to practice in order for their team to win.
Actual case: The case is based on 2011's Hong Kong Sapling Football Club player Iu Wai who would offer bribes to other players in order to fix a match.

Case #5: Partner
Starring:
Eddie Kwan as ICAC Edmond Lee
Vincent Wong as ICAC Jacky
Kenny Wong as Chow Sir
Jade Leung as Elaine Wong Sui Ling
Desmond So as John Ng
Hoffman Cheng as Fung Chi Keung
ICAC reached its 20th anniversary in the 1990s and it was also reported that police corruption was in its decline because of the ICAC agency dedication on bringing those who corrupt to justice. But in the present time a case involving more than twenty police officers, ranging from low to high ranks including police officer Fung Chi Keung (Hoffman Cheng) and Chief Inspector John Ng (Desmond So) corruption is brought to the attention of ICAC. ICAC investigator Edmond Lee (Eddie Kwan) who was part of a police corruption case in the 90's now leads rookie investigator Jacky (Vincent Wong) to follow up on the new corruption case.

Premiere
A premiere screening of the first episode was held at the Grand Theatre of the Hong Kong Cultural Centre on 26 March 2014, one week before the airing of the series.

Ratings

See also
ICAC Investigators (TV series)
Independent Commission Against Corruption (Hong Kong)

References

External links
Official TVB Website (Chinese)
Official ICAC Website
Official ichannel Website (Chinese)

TVB dramas
Hong Kong television series
ICAC Investigators (TV series)
2014 Hong Kong television series debuts
2014 Hong Kong television series endings
2010s Hong Kong television series